Clóvis Bento da Cruz (born 25 June 1970) is a Brazilian former footballer who played as a striker.

Career
Born in Barra do Garças, Clóvis is a youth prospect of América (SP), from where he became a professional footballer, competing for club in the second level of the Campeonato Paulista. After moving to Guarani, he scored 13 goals in the 1993 Campeonato Brasileiro Série A, finishing one shy of top-scorer, Guga.

In 1994, he joined Benfica, debuting on 20 August 1994 in a home win against S.C. Beira-Mar, scoring the second goal. Three days later he played the first leg of the Supertaça Cândido de Oliveira, but was soon sidelined by  manager Artur Jorge, who claimed he need time to adapt to Portugal, with Clóvis requesting to be loaned out. He briefly joined Vitória de Setúbal in the second half of 1994–95.

Clóvis returned to Brazil in 1995, to play for Vasco da Gama, where he would reunite with former teammate Paulão, and future Benfica striker, Valdir. He was the club top-scorer in the 1995 edition of the Campeonato Carioca and third overall. On 6 October 1995, he was loaned to Corinthians.

After a successful year in Vasco, Clóvis became a constant traveller, passing through 15 different clubs in ten years, retiring in 2005 at age 35 due to heart problems.

References

External links
 

1970 births
Living people
Sportspeople from Mato Grosso
Brazilian footballers
Brazilian expatriate footballers
S.L. Benfica footballers
Vitória F.C. players
América Futebol Clube (SP) players
CR Vasco da Gama players
Sport Club Corinthians Paulista players
Santos FC players
Club Athletico Paranaense players
Grêmio Foot-Ball Porto Alegrense players
Club Deportivo Palestino footballers
Chilean Primera División players
Brazilian expatriate sportspeople in Chile
Expatriate footballers in Chile
Barcelona S.C. footballers
Expatriate footballers in Ecuador
Brazilian expatriate sportspeople in Venezuela
Expatriate footballers in Venezuela
Brazilian expatriate sportspeople in Portugal
Expatriate footballers in Portugal
Associação Atlética Francana players
Mogi Mirim Esporte Clube players
Mirassol Futebol Clube players
América Futebol Clube (RN) players
Associação Atlética Caldense players
Association football forwards